Events from the year 2012 in Paraguay

Incumbents 
 President: 
Fernando Lugo (until 22 June)
Federico Franco (took office 22 June)

Events 

 June 21 - President Fernando Lugo is impeached and removed from office

Sport 
 27 July to 12 August - Paraguay at the 2012 Summer Olympics

Unknown dates 
 2012 in Paraguayan football

Deaths in 2012

January 
 1 January - Hermann Guggiari, 87, engineer and sculptor. (born 1924)  (Spanish)

References 

 
Paraguay
Years of the 21st century in Paraguay
2010s in Paraguay
Paraguay